Kamenica Sasa may also refer to:

ŽFK Kamenica Sasa, a Macedonian women's association football club
FK Sasa, a Macedonian men's association football club

See also
Kamenica (disambiguation)